Belleville High School East is a public high school in Belleville, Illinois, United States. It is part of Belleville Township High School District. It was established in 1966.

History
Prior to 1966, Belleville Township School District operated only one school, Belleville Township High School, which was the old Belleville West campus (a new campus has since been built). The growth of the district prompted the local board of education to construct a new campus and divide the student body between the two schools.

The new campus was built in a college format with many different buildings. The newly commissioned Belleville Area College (now Southwestern Illinois College) occupied half of the campus while the new high school occupied the other. Enrollment in the school increased rapidly and the college was forced to move to a new location.

Major renovations were completed in 2009. These included new landscaping, more classrooms, remodeled classrooms and buildings, new lockers, and a new cafeteria.

Notable alumni

 Chase Allen, football player, Linebacker for Southern Illinois University (Carbondale), Undrafted free agent with Miami Dolphins in May 2017, 2017 starter for Miami Dolphins 
 Malcolm Hill, ESPN ranked #72 basketball player in Class of 2013, starter at University of Illinois, Israel Basketball Premier League, Chicago Bulls 2021-2022]]
 Matt Russell, All-American college football player, pro player and sports administrator
 Rob Strano, former touring professional golfer; PGA Tour; Nike/Buy.Com/Nationwide Tour; Golf Channel Academy; golf instructor
 Randy Wells, former MLB pitcher (Chicago Cubs)

Wall of Fame 
The school established a "Lancer Wall of Fame" to recognize noteworthy alumni, faculty, support staff and community members.

Class of 2004 

 Mark Hollmann, Tony Award-winning songwriter
 Matt Russell

Class of 2006 

 Alumnus Paul Gompers, Ph.D., Harvard Professor/Marathon Record Setter/entrepreneur, Class of 1982

Class of 2010 
 Nathan Hodel, NFL Player/Hodel Foundation, Class of 1996 
 Mark Kern, Public Servant, Class of 1981

Class of 2012 
 Alumnus (1978 graduate) Lt. Col. David P. Cooley

Class of 2018 
 Dr. Bob Farmer, 1987 East graduate

References

Belleville, Illinois
Public high schools in Illinois
Schools in St. Clair County, Illinois
Educational institutions established in 1966
1966 establishments in Illinois